Diodora jukesii, common name Jukes' keyhole limpet, is a species of sea snail, a marine gastropod mollusk in the family Fissurellidae, the keyhole limpets and slit limpets.

Description
The size of the shell varies between 23 mm and 63 mm.

Distribution
This marine species is endemic to Australia and occurs off the Northern Territory, Queensland and Western Australia
.

References

Further reading
 Reeve, L.A. 1850. Monograph of the genus Fissurella. pls 1-16 in Reeve, L.A. (ed). Conchologia Iconica. London : L. Reeve & Co. Vol. 6.
 Sowerby, G.B. 1862. Thesaurus Conchyliorum, or monographs of genera of shells. London : Sowerby Vol. 3.
 Thiele, J. 1930. Gastropoda und Bivalvia. pp. 561–596 in Michaelsen, W. & Hartmayer, R. (eds). Die Fauna Südwest-Australiens. Jena : Gustav Fischer Vol. 5. 
 Cotton, B.C. 1930. Fissurellidae from the 'Flindersian' Region, Southern Australia. Records of the South Australian Museum (Adelaide) 4(2): 219-236
 Ponder, W.F. 1978. The unfigured Mollusca of J. Thiele. 1930 published in Die Fauna Sudwest-Australiens. Records of the Western Australian Museum 6(4): 423-441
 Cernohorsky, W.O. 1978. Tropical Pacific Marine Shells. Sydney : Pacific Publications 352 pp., 68 pls.
 Wilson, B. 1993. Australian Marine Shells. Prosobranch Gastropods. Kallaroo, Western Australia : Odyssey Publishing Vol. 1 408 pp.

External links
 To World Register of Marine Species

Fissurellidae
Gastropods of Australia
Gastropods described in 1850